The Gauliga Sudetenland, was the highest football league in the Sudetenland, the predominantly German-speaking parts of Czechoslovakia that were awarded to the German Reich on 30 September 1938 through the Munich Agreement. Shortly after the completion of the occupation on 10 October 1938, the Nazis reorganised the administration in the region, forming the Reichsgau Sudetenland.

Overview
After the German occupation, a Gauliga Sudetenland championship was organized by the Nazi Sports Office in 1938–39 in the form of a knock-out competition involving the four regional champions, the Bezirksmeister. The winner of this competition qualified for the German championship.

Throughout the league's existence, only ethnically German clubs were permitted to take part in the Gauliga. Except for the 1938-39 edition, when clubs still operated under their original names, almost all teams had to adopt the prefix NTSG standing for Nationalsozialistische Turnergemeinde and were under direct Nazi control. The only clubs outside this system were the military clubs.

In March 1939, Nazi Germany went to occupy the remaining part of Czechoslovakia. It formed the German controlled Protectorate of Bohemia and Moravia and the nominally independent country of Slovakia. Ethnically German clubs from the newly occupied region took part in the Gauliga Sudetenland, especially from Prague.

The league proper started in 1939, with eleven teams in two groups. The two group champions played a one-off final to determine the Sudetenland champion. The season after the league was reduced to seven teams in an otherwise unchanged setup. The season was greatly shortened due to a number of clubs dropping out throughout it.

The 1941–42 season saw a return to a more organised league system with eighteen clubs in three equal divisions. The three divisional champions then played a home-and-away finals round to determine the Sudetenland champion. The following season, the league was again reduced in numbers throughout the season, finishing with fifteen clubs in the same three groups, four in the eastern group, five in the central and six in the western group. Again, a finals tournament for the group champions was played. From 1943, clubs from the Protectorate left to take part in the new Gauliga Böhmen und Mähren.

In its last completed season, the league operated with thirteen clubs in two divisions, with a home-and-away  final of the two divisional champions at the end. Not every club however completed their full program of matches.

The imminent collapse of Nazi Germany in 1945 affected all Gauligas and its doubtful whether the 1944–45 season in the Gauliga Sudetenland got under way at all.

Members of the league

Founding members
The league was formed of twelve clubs in two divisions in 1939:

Group I:
 NTSG Graslitz
 NSTG Teplitz-Schönau
 NSTG Eger
 NSTG Brüx
 NSTG Karlsbad
 NSTG Komotau

Group II:
 NSTG Gablonz
 NSTG Böhmisch Leipa
 NSTG Aussig
 NSTG Prosetitz
 NSTG Warnsdorf
 NSTG Reichenberg (withdrew during the season)

The abbreviation NSTG stands for Nationalsozialistische Turngemeinde.

Non-founding members
 NSTG Asch, played part of one season (1940–41)

Winners and runners-up of the league
The winners and runners-up of the league:

Aftermath
At the end of the Second World War, the German population of the Sudetenland was almost completely expelled. Only a small minority remains in what is now the Czech Republic.

All German football clubs were dissolved and the Czechoslovak First League once more became the highest level of play for the whole country, but now without any ethnically German clubs, the last of which had been relegated in 1936 from the top division.

References

Sources
 Die deutschen Gauligen 1933-45 - Heft 1-3  Tables of the Gauligas 1933–45, publisher: DSFS
 Kicker Almanach,  The yearbook on German football from Bundesliga to Oberliga, since 1937, published by the Kicker Sports Magazine

External links
  The Gauligas Das Deutsche Fussball Archiv 
 Germany - Championships 1902-1945 at RSSSF.com
 Where's My Country? Article on cross-border movements of football clubs, at RSSSF.com
 RSSSF.com - Czechoslovakia / Czech Republic - List of League Tables

Gauliga
1938 establishments in Germany
Gauliga
Sports leagues established in 1938
1945 disestablishments in Germany